Elvis Hitler is an American rock band from Detroit, Michigan. The band was named after the moniker of their lead singer, Jim Leedy, a combination of rockabilly singer Elvis Presley's first name and the last name of dictator Adolf Hitler.

History 
The band currently consists of singer Jim Leedy (a.k.a. "Elvis Hitler"), guitarist John Defever, and drummer Geno OneMore. Their first album, Disgraceland, was initially released on Wang Head records in 1987 (WH004) and early copies came in a handmade sleeve formed from corrugated cardboard with a black-and-white sheet pasted to the front and back. The band put out two CDs on Restless Records: Hellbilly and Supersadomasochisticexpialidocious.

Their song "Green Haze" consisted of the lyrics from the TV show Green Acres sung to the tune of Jimi Hendrix's "Purple Haze", and was a college radio hit.

Due to the resistance of having a band with the name Hitler in the title, regardless of its intent, the band released one album under the name "Splatter".

The band and their song "Green Haze" are mentioned in Thomas Pynchon's 2013 novel Bleeding Edge (pg. 177).

Discography 

Disgraceland (1988)

Hellbilly (1989)

Supersadomasochisticexpialidocious (1992)

...From Hell to Eternity (1994)

 See also 
 List of psychobilly bands

 Notes 
1.Released with the band renamed as Splatter'.

External links 

 Elvis Hitler band history
 Elvis Hitler reunion in 2003
 Elvis Hitler on motorcityrock.com
 Elvis Hitler on last.fm
 Elvis Hitler on myspace

Musical groups from Detroit
Musical groups established in 1986
1986 establishments in Michigan
American psychobilly musical groups
Naming controversies
Music controversies